Devi is a 1972 Indian Malayalam film, directed by K. S. Sethumadhavan and produced by M. O. Joseph. The film stars Prem Nazir, Madhu, Sheela and Adoor Bhasi in the lead roles. The film had musical score by G. Devarajan.

Cast

Prem Nazir
Madhu
Sheela
Adoor Bhasi
Sankaradi
Khadeeja
Meena
Paravoor Bharathan
Philomina
Rani Chandra
Sujatha

Soundtrack
The music was composed by G. Devarajan and the lyrics were written by Vayalar Ramavarma.

References

External links
 

1972 films
1970s Malayalam-language films
Films directed by K. S. Sethumadhavan